Resolution (208) is the second ship of the Endurance-class landing platform dock of the Republic of Singapore Navy.

Development 
The navy's intention to purchase the Endurance-class was revealed by former Defence Minister Dr. Tony Tan during his visit to Tuas Naval Base on 3 August 1996. These ships were to replace the five ex-United States Navy (USN) County-class LSTs, which were acquired by Singapore from the United States in the 1970s. ST Marine was awarded the government contract to design and build the four ships – a significant milestone for the local defence and shipbuilding industries given the scale and extensiveness of the programme.

Construction and career
She was laid down on  27 March 1997 and launched on 1 August 1998. She was commissioned on 18 March 2000 with the hull number 208.

RSS Resolution successfully fired a Mistral surface-to-air missile during Exercise Cooperation Afloat Readiness and Training in 2000, an annual joint naval exercise between the USN and RSN.

Resolution was sent to the Persian Gulf in November 2004 to take over RSS Endurance for peacekeeping efforts. 

In 2007, RSS Resolution taking on the expanded role of taking charge of coalition and Iraqi Navy ships to defend Iraq's oil platforms. She was subsequently tasked for RSN's fifth deployment to the Gulf on 30 August 2008.

Gallery

References

External links

Endurance-class landing platform docks
Ships built in Singapore
1998 ships